Melina Matthews  is a Spanish-born actress and presenter, known as a presenter for the Sitges Film Festival (Festival Internacional de Cinema Fantàstic de Catalunya), and for her acting roles as Ana in the 2018 film Silencio, as Juana in season 2 of La peste (The plague) 2019, as new teacher Carmen in season 2 of La otra mirada (A different view) also 2019, and as Sister Shannon Masters in Warrior Nun in 2020.

Early life 
Melina Matthews was born in 1986, in Barcelona; she is the daughter of a Welsh father and a French mother,</ref> who were both interpreter/translators.
At the age of 19, Matthews moved to London to study for a BA Hons degree in Investigative Journalism at the University of Westminster, graduating in 2009. During her time as a student in London, Matthews studied theatre at the Central School of Speech and Drama  working at The Old Vic theatre and at the Southbank Centre, with hopes of pursuing an acting career. Her initial involvement in theatre, was as an accent trainer and dialogue coach, helping American actors to polish their English and Spanish accents.

Acting career 
Matthews debut appearance on the big screen was as Laura Moffat in the movie  Savage Grace 2007, opposite Julianne Moore and Eddie Redmayne. In 2013. Matthews played the voice of 'Mama' in the Guillermo del Toro produced horror film Mama. 

In 2016, Matthews landed a role as Sofía Marín alongside Jodie Comer in the BBC television miniseries Thirteen.
Melina Matthews co-starred alongside Marc Clotet as lovers in the movie El Jugador De Ajedrez (The Chess player), which featured at the Málaga Film Festival 2017. Matthews played the lead actress role as 'Ana' in the Mexico-based 2018 film Silencio.

In 2019, Matthews starred as Juana in season 2 of La peste (The plague) set in bubonic plague ridden 16th century Seville. Matthews was a replacement for Cecilia Freire playing a main character of new teacher Carmen in season 2 of La otra mirada (A different view)  in 2019. Matthews had a short guest role as Sister Shannon Masters, the former ‘Halo-bearer’ in Warrior Nun in 2020. Non-acting
For many years, Matthews has been a presenter at the Sitges Film Festival (Festival Internacional de Cinema Fantàstic de Catalunya), which is a Spanish film festival specialising in fantasy and horror films.
In 2017, Matthews was reported to be in a relationship with Spanish film actor and director Raúl Arévalo, whom she purportedly met while filming El Negociador (The Negotiator)'' in 2014.

Filmography

Film

Television

References

External links
 
 Melina Matthews instagram
 Melina Matthews twitter
 Video Showreel

1986 births
21st-century Spanish actresses
Actresses from Barcelona
Alumni of the Royal Central School of Speech and Drama
Alumni of the University of Westminster
Living people
People from Barcelona
Spanish film actresses
Spanish people of Welsh descent
Spanish people of French descent
Spanish stage actresses
Spanish television actresses